Deep Fried Fanclub is a rarities compilation album by Scottish alternative rock band Teenage Fanclub, released in 1995. It mostly features non-album singles and b-sides released through the band's association with Paperhouse and K Records.

Track listing

Personnel

Credits adapted from the album's liner notes.
Norman Blake - guitar, vocals
Gerard Love - bass, vocals
Raymond McGinley - guitar, vocals
Brendan O'Hare - drums
Francis MacDonald – drums

Production
 Teenage Fanclub – production [1-10]  
 Don Fleming – production [5-12]
 Ted Blakeway – engineering [4]  
 Wharton Tiers – engineering [5-10]  
 Paul Chisholm – engineering [11-12]  
 Keith Hartley – engineering [11-12]
 Steve Rooke – mastering at Abbey Road

Notes
Track 1 recorded at Suite 16, Rochdale, England, December 1989 
Track 2–3 recorded 1989
Track 4 recorded at Pet Sounds, Glasgow, Scotland, July 1989
Tracks 5-10 recorded at Fun City, New York City, USA, July 1990 
Tracks 11-12 recorded at Amazon,  Liverpool, England, Spring 1991

References

External links 
 Deep Fried Fanclub on Discogs.com. Retrieved on 7 January 2019.

1995 compilation albums
Teenage Fanclub compilation albums
Albums produced by Don Fleming (musician)
Fire Records (UK) compilation albums